In gridiron football, a block in the back is an action in which a blocker contacts a non-ballcarrying member of the opposing team from behind and above the waist. The foul may be called when the area blocked is anywhere on the back.  It is  against the rules in most leagues, carrying a 10-yard penalty.

Violations mostly occur on broken field plays such as on punt and kick returns when players come to help returners and fail to get a proper angle to block the opponent, or when a player running with the ball breaks through into the backfield and pursuing players are blocked illegally by other members of the offence.

The penalty was first enacted in the 2006 season "while the ball is in flight during a scrimmage kick."
The signal for this penalty is the ref holding his right arm out as to show a pushing motion and the left arm under the wrist of the right arm, both moving simultaneously showing the foul on the play.

References

Gridiron football penalties